The Presbyterian Church in Korea (HapDongJangShin) is a Presbyterian and Reformed denomination in South Korea, that was separated form the KoRyuPa in 1980. The founder was Rev. Kil Young-Bok. It adheres to the Apostles Creed and the Westminster Confession. In 2004 the church had 32,163 members in 112 congregations and 143 ordained clergy.

References 

Presbyterian denominations in South Korea
Presbyterian denominations in Asia